"Like Money" is a single by the South Korean girl group Wonder Girls. The song features Senegalese-American singer Akon. The song and music video were released July 10, 2012. The song was sent to mainstream top 40 stations on September 17, 2012. The song was the last English language release by Wonder Girls.

Background
Prior to its release, the song was featured on their TV movie, The Wonder Girls, which aired on TeenNick.

The song was written by Cri$tyle, and Lukas Hilbert and produced by Woo S. Rhee " RAINSTONE" and Hilbert, with music by Aleksander Kronlund, Woo S. Rhee " RAINSTONE and Lukas Hilbert with additional executive production by Teriy Keys.  The choreography was created by Jonte' Moaning, who previously created the choreography for "The DJ is Mine" and "Be My Baby".

Release and promotion
On July 4, 2012 the first teaser for the music video of "Like Money" was released, showcasing a "space" concept.

JYPE revealed that a special artist would be collaborating with the girls on the song who had amassed over 40 million likes on Facebook. A teaser released on July 6 confirmed the featuring artist to be Akon. In addition, Johnny Wujek was revealed as the stylist for the video; he is also Katy Perry's stylist and a cast member of America's Next Top Model, Cycle 19.

The first live performances of the song took place at the Green Groove Festival 2012 on July 21 and at Chungcheongnam-do’s Boryeung seaside on July 22.

Track listing

Charts

In its first week of release the song debuted at number 11 in South Korea with 161,542 downloads. By the end of August 2012 the song was downloaded 583,737 times in South Korea alone, making the song one of the best-selling English-language songs of the year in Korea.

References

2012 singles
Wonder Girls songs
Songs written by Lukas Loules
Songs written by Crystal Nicole
2012 songs
Akon songs
JYP Entertainment singles